Maker is a surname. Notable people with the surname include:

Joyce Maker, American politician
Michael J. Maker (born 1969), American horse trainer
Mike Maker (basketball) (born 1965), American basketball coach
 A family of Australian basketball players of South Sudanese origin:
 Thon Maker (born 1997), a forward-center born in South Sudan
 Matur Maker (born 1998), brother of Thon, also a forward-center born in South Sudan
 Makur Maker (born 2000), cousin of Thon and Matur, a center born in Kenya